The 152nd Infantry Division was a formation of the French Army. It saw service in the First World War, Second World War, and during the Cold War, when it guarded the intercontinental ballistic missile bases on the Plateau d'Albion.

Before its disestablishment during the 1990s, it included the 152ème R.C.S., the 19ème Régiment de Chasseurs (Draguignan), the 
86ème R.I. (Issoire), the 4ème R.I.Ma (Fréjus), the 24ème R.I.Ma (Perpignan), and the 19ème R.A. (Draguignan).

References and external links

David Isby and Charles Kamps, Armies of NATO's Central Front, Jane's Publishing Company, 1985
AFGG, vol. 2, t. 10 : Ordres de bataille des grandes unités : divisions d'infanterie, divisions de cavalerie, 1924, 1092 p.
Battle of the Aisne @ Collectif de Recherche International et de Débat sur la guerre de 1914-1918

Infantry divisions of France
Military units and formations established in 1915